Wang Meng (born 15 October 1934) is a Chinese writer who served as China's Minister of Culture from 1986 to 1989.

Biography 
Wang was born in Beijing in 1934.  During his middle school years, he was introduced to communist ideology and in 1949 officially joined the Communist Youth League.

Wang Meng has published over 60 books since 1955, including six novels, ten short-story collections, as well as other works of poetry, prose and critical essays. His works have been translated and published in 21 different languages.

In 1956 Wang published a controversial piece, "The Young Newcomer in the Organizational Department". This caused a great uproar and subsequently led to his being labelled a "rightist".  In 1963, he was sent to Xinjiang to be "reformed" through labor.  It was largely during this period of hardship that he accrued much of the experience that would later become the material for his short stories and novels.  Not until 1979 was this injury redressed. In 1980 he was invited to be in residency at the International Writing Program at the University of Iowa.

He served as China's Minister of Culture from July 1986 to September 1989.

In an article in The New Yorker, critic Jianying Zha asked, 'Is China's most eminent writer a reformer or an apologist?' in response to the criticism of Wang Meng's public lecture at the Frankfurt International Book Fair on October 18, 2009.

On 27 June 2015 at the United International College's 7th Graduation Ceremony in Zhuhai, Wang Meng was rewarded with the Honorary Fellowships. In 2015 he was awarded the Mao Dun Literature Prize for 'Scenery on this Side.

Selected publications
Books available in English
 100 Glimpses into China: Short Short Stories from China (by Wang Meng, Feng Jicai, Wang Zengqi and others) (Xu Yihe and Daniel J. Meissner). Beijing: Foreign Languages Press, 1989.
 Alienation (Nance T. Lin and Tong Qi Lin). Hong Kong: Joint Publishing Co., 1993.
 Bolshevik Salute: A Modernist Chinese Novel (Wendy Larson). Seattle: University of Washington Press, 1989.
 Prize-winning Stories from China, 1978-1979 (by Liu Xinwu, Wang Meng, and others). Beijing: Foreign Languages Press, 1981.
 Snowball (Cathy Silber and Deirdre Huang). Beijing: Foreign Languages Press, 1989.
 The Butterfly and Other Stories (intro. by Rui An). Beijing: Chinese Literature,1983.
 The Strain of Meeting (Denis C. Mair). Beijing: Foreign Languages Press, 1989.
 The Stubborn Porridge and Other Stories (Zhu Hong). New York: George Braziller, 1994.
 Wonderful Xinjiang: A photographic journey of China's largest province as told through the pen of Wang Meng''. Pleasantville: Reader's Digest, 2004.

References

1934 births
Living people
Ministers of Culture of the People's Republic of China
Short story writers from Beijing
People's Republic of China politicians from Beijing
Chinese Communist Party politicians from Beijing
International Writing Program alumni
Chinese male novelists
Mao Dun Literature Prize laureates
Beijing No. 4 High School alumni
Chinese male short story writers
20th-century Chinese short story writers
Victims of the Anti-Rightist Campaign
People's Republic of China short story writers